The People's Defence Force (abbreviated: PDF)  is the armed wing of the National Unity Government (NUG). The armed wing was formed by the NUG from youths and pro-democracy activists on 5 May 2021 in response to the coup d'état that occurred on 1 February 2021 that put the military junta and their armed wing the Tatmadaw in power. Despite its support from the people of Myanmar, the military junta designated it as a terrorist organisation on 8 May 2021. In October 2021, NUG's Ministry of Defence announced that it had formed a central committee to coordinate military operations across the country.

According to the NUG statement, the PDF is divided into five regional commands (Northern, Southern, Central, Eastern and Western commands), each mounting at least three brigades. Each brigade consists of five battalions, which divide into four companies. On 13 July 2021, NUG's minister of defence Yee Mon stated that the strength of the newly-formed militia was expected to reach 8,000 by the end of the month. Estimates by The Irrawadday put the PDF's numbers at 65,000 in November 2022. PDF believe in the usage of guerrilla warfare tactics to achieve their aims.

History 

Minister of Defence Yee Mon announced on 16 April 2021 that NUG would establish an armed wing that would cooperate with various ethnic armed organisations to launch an armed revolution against the junta. On 5 May 2021, NUG announced the formation of the PDF as a "forerunner of the federal armed forces". It also stated that the PDF formed in response to the violence happening throughout the country. On 28 May 2021, NUG released a video of the PDF's graduation ceremony, announcing that the armed wing was ready to challenge the junta's forces. On 7 September 2021, the NUG announced the launch of the "People's Defensive War" against the military junta, and urged the citizens to revolt against the junta in every corner of the country.

On 7 September 2022, NUG acting president Duwa Lashi La gave a speech on the one-year anniversary of the defensive war. He stated that the PDF suffered from 1,500 casualties within one year after the declaration, and that the junta was losing their territorial control. The NUG also stated that 2023 would be an important year as they would "successfully end the revolution in that year and six battlefronts would be opened to do so".

Starting from 2023, local PDFs have been reportedly planning to perform coordinated attacks against the regime as a "Phase 2 of the NUG's one year plan".

Yangon Region clashes 
On 14 August 2021, the PDF ambushed six heavily armed policemen who were travelling along the Yangon Circular Railway. Five were killed. A sixth was injured but survived. Four automatic rifles were seized.

Shan State clashes 
The PDF clashed with the Tatmadaw in Muse on 23 May 2021, killing at least 13 members of Myanmar's security forces. Another clash happened in the town of Moebyel, in which 20 members of the police force were killed.

Chin State clashes 

Chin State saw some of the earliest armed resistance. Clashes were reported initially in late March 2021. Armed with traditional tumi guns, ethnic Chin inflicted casualties on the Tatmadaw. In early April 2021, Chinland Defense Force (CDF) was established. Tatmadaw saw heavy casualties in clashes with Mindat branch of the CDF in late April and May 2021. CDF Mindat briefly occupied the town, but was forced to withdraw when the Tatmadaw used civilians as shields.

Chin National Army, the existing Chin armed organisation, various township branches of the CDF and Chin National Defence Force (an armed Chin organization formed after the coup) came together to form a joint defence coordination body called Chinland Joint Defense Committee (CJDC). The total strength of active personnel under the command of CJDC was approximated to be around 13,000. From August to October 2021, it was reported that at least 40 clashes occurred between junta troops and CDF. CJDC claimed that at least 1,029 Tatmadaw soldiers were killed in the clashes and lost 58 of their own in 2021.

Karenni State clashes 
Karenni PDF launched attacks in Demoso and Bawlakhe townships, killing at least twenty Tatmadaw soldiers and police and burning down three outposts on 26 May 2021. Tatmadaw retaliated by shelling residential areas.

On 31 May 2021, Karenni Nationalities Defence Force (KNDF) was formed as a merger of scattered PDF groups in the Karenni state and some local Ethnic Armed Organisations. The main organisation was Karenni National Progressive Party.

Sagaing clashes 
The PDF, along with the Kachin Independence Army, began assaults on Tatmadaw positions in Katha, Sagaing around the end of May 2021, killing eight regime soldiers and injuring thirteen. On 24 and 26 June 2021, combined PDF and KIA forces clashed with the Tatmadaw, reportedly killing at least 44 regime troops.

On 15 January 2022, a combined force of PDF and All Burma Students' Democratic Front attacked two Tatmadaw ships approaching Katha from Shwegu using rocket-propelled grenades. This confrontation marks the first time ABSDF had engaged the Tatmadaw since the beginning of the coup, entering a war against the regime and openly siding with the PDF.

On 1 February 2023, a local PDF shot down a Tatmadaw Mi-17 helicopter during a clash in Shwepyiaye, Homalin Township. On 8 and 9 February, a coalition of local PDFs, under the leadership of the NUG's defence ministry, launched an attack on "15 military targets in the region", killing 44 and injuring 8 regime troops. During the attack, 2 PDF soldiers were killed and 13 were injured.

Mandalay clashes 
In early June 2021, PDF activities increased significantly across the Mandalay District, with multiple violent clashes with pro-junta security forces reported in Mandalay City and surrounding townships.

On 1 June, a PDF fighter shot two soldiers, killing one, outside of a high school that had been forced to re-open by junta authorities despite a nationwide boycott of government-run schools. The leader of the PDF in Mandalay, Bo Nat Khat, also claimed responsibility for recent bombings in five townships. The military junta called the PDF attacks acts of terrorism.

In Patheingyi Township on 8 June, three PDF fighters in a vehicle rammed two police officers on motorbikes before shooting and killing them. The PDF claimed responsibility for the attack, which was confirmed by a pro-democracy police officer.

On 22 June, Tatmadaw forces in armoured vehicles raided a PDF base in Chanmyathazi Township, resulting in the deaths of two fighters and six arrests, according to the PDF. Tatmadaw-owned media sources claimed that four PDF fighters were killed and eight arrested, while some security forces were injured. Later that day, the Mandalay PDF spokesperson announced that the group had "declared war" on the junta.

Other activities 
In early June 2021, a combined force of five armed groups; the Democratic Karen Buddhist Army (DKBA) splinter group, PDF, KNU/KNLA Peace Council (KPC), Karen National Defence Organisation (KNDO) and a Karen Border Guard Force (BGF) splinter group clashed with Tatmadaw and Karen BGF in Phlu village, Karen state. Brigadier General Saw Kyaw Thet, commander-in-chief of the DKBA splinter group stated that the five armed groups are cooperating throughout Karen.

A villager of Kin Ma, Magway, reported on 15 June 2021 that PDF forces had clashed with security forces in the village. Following this incident, Tatmadaw forces burned down the village, killing at least two. Ye PDF, allied with Thanbyuzayat PDF together destroyed military junta owned business Mytel's telecom tower, located in Thanbyuzayat Township, on 1 October.

On March 15, in an interview published by Irrawaddy Media, "If the last six months of the people's resistance were to be considered as the first stage of the revolution, at this stage the PDF comrades will be involved in guerrilla warfare," he said. "They have been able to carry out effective war operations. They were able to destroy the enemy force on a daily basis. Now our PDFs have taken control of many rural areas."

Tatmadaw defections 
The Burmese military has experienced increased defections to the civil disobedience movement and the PDF since the coup. NUG and PDF groups launched propaganda and psychological warfare campaigns. Army defectors generally face death sentences, which are then commuted to life in prison.

By September 2021, the number of defectors had risen to 1,500 soldiers and 500 police officers, most of whom were privates and sergeants. Notable among them was Brigadier-General Phyo Thant, who led the Northwest Command until October 2021 when he was detained by the military after his plans to defect were exposed. Sagaing Region and Chin State, which are part of the Northwest Command, saw armed resistance from the PDF.

As of 15 February 2022, the number of defectors had risen to over 16,000 soldiers and police officers who had joined Myanmar’s Civil Disobedience Movement. 75% of defectors expressed their willingness to join the PDF earlier that month.

Equipment 
The PDF operates using a mixture of makeshift, locally-manufactured, and foreign-manufactured small arms. Many PDF subgroups initially used makeshift bolt-action rifles. Some subgroups used homemade hunting rifles as of 2022. Many PDF battalions used assault rifles seized from military troops in ambushes and joint-operations with local ethnic armed organizations. Seized weapons are often domestically manufactured by the military and use a 5.56×45mm NATO cartridge, including the MK-II (locally-manufactured Galil variant) and the MK-III bullpup (locally-manufactured QBZ-97 variant) versions of the MA-1 assault rifle, the MA-4 assault rifle, and the MA-11 assault rifle (locally-manufactured HK-33 variant). PDF may use arms identical to those used by ethnic armed organizations such as the Karen National Liberation Army and the Kachin Independence Army, which include variants of the M-16 and the Kachin-manufactured variant of the Chinese Type 81 assault rifle known as the K-09. 

Several PDF units also operate a series of Light Machine Guns.

In January 2022, the PDF launched its own small arms manufacturing operations. It began to mass-produce the FGC-9 PCC through 3-D printing, a semiautomatic carbine that operates on 9mm cartridges. An organization of military defectors known as the People's Soldiers Production Team  (PSPT) began an arms manufacturing operation called Project A-1. PSPT aimed to economically produce variants of the M-16 and the AK-47 as well as ammunition, such as the 5.56×45mm NATO cartridge, the 7.62x39mm cartridge, the 7.62×51mm NATO cartridge, the 9×19mm Parabellum cartridge, the .22 caliber cartridge, the RPG-7 rocket-propelled grenade, the 60mm Lightweight Mortar round, the 40×46mm grenade, and the M67 grenade   

Video footage and reports of an Air Force jet shot down in Kayah State on 20 February 2022 led to speculation that the PDF possessed man-portable air-defense systems.

See also

References

2021 establishments in Myanmar
Military units and formations established in 2021
Paramilitary organisations based in Myanmar
Rebel groups in Myanmar